Tamatam or Tamatan is an island, village and municipality in the state of Chuuk, Federated States of Micronesia.

Tamatam or Thamatam  is also referred to  one family name or Surname  in Reddy community / Caste, Predominantly lives in the state of Andhra Pradesh, India. But this Tamatam  Surname does not relate in any way to island  Tamatam. The Surname or family name Tamatam  inherited to some families   living in the State of Andhra Pradesh  is derived from a musicale instrument  called as Tamatamu, being used in village functions  in ancient times . Now  this musical instrument is  almost extinguished and not in use.

References
Statoids.com, retrieved December 8, 2010

Municipalities of Chuuk State
Islands of Chuuk State